Highway 302 is a national highway in greater Bangkok, Thailand. It includes two connecting roads: Rattanathibet Road and Ngam Wong Wan Road.

Rattanathibet Road 
Rattanathibet Road starts at Kanchanaphisek Road (Motorway Route 9) in Sao Thong Hin subdistrict, Bang Yai District, Nonthaburi, and runs east through Bang Bua Thong District, passes Bang Kruai - Sai Noi Road (Route 3215) at Bang Phlu intersection and Mueang Nonthaburi district, passes Ratchaphruek Road at Bang Rak Noi intersection and crosses the Chao Phraya River on the Phra Nang Klao Bridge, passes Nonthaburi 1 Road (Route 3110) and passes Liang Mueang Nonthaburi Road and continues east until it ends at Khae Rai intersection, where it intersects with Tiwanon Road (Route 306) and the route continues as Ngam Wong Wan Road.

Ngam Wong Wan Road 
Ngam Wong Wan Road continues east from Rattanathibet Road at Khae Rai intersection in Nonthaburi, crossing into Bangkok at Lak Si District, then passing through Chatuchak District, ending at Kaset intersection, where it intersects with Phahonyothin Road. Via a bypass tunnel beneath Kasetsart, the road continues as Prasoet Manukit Road (Thailand Route 351).

Ngam Wong Wan Road is named for Damrong Ngamwongwan, a Department of Highways engineer who oversaw construction of the road. It was a policy of the Plaek Phibunsongkhram government that new roads be named for their chief engineers.

References

External links
 Thailand Route 302 on Google Maps.

Streets in Bangkok
National highways in Thailand